The Church of St Tysoi, is the parish church of Llansoy, Monmouthshire, Wales and sits to the south of the village.  It is in the Perpendicular style and is a Grade I listed building as of 19 August 1955.

History and architecture

The church is medieval in origin, of Old Red Sandstone.  The tower may be "no earlier than the early nineteenth century."*  The church was lightly restored in the nineteenth century including work by John Pollard Seddon.

The interior has a fifteenth-century barrel roof and contemporary fittings.  It also has some notable stained glass windows of the nineteen twenties and of the later twentieth century, including a "brilliantly coloured" "Genesis" window by Geoffrey Robinson.

Notes

References

External links
Artworks at St Tysoi, Llansoy

Grade I listed churches in Monmouthshire
Church in Wales church buildings